Zygopetalum triste is a species of perennial herb in the Orchidaceae family. In English, it goes by the common name The Dark Purple Zygopetalum.

The species can be found in south eastern Brazil in the state of Minas Gerais.

References 

triste